The Cosmic Hunt is an old and widely distributed family of cognate myths. They are stories about a large animal that is pursued by hunters, is wounded, and is transformed into a constellation. Variants of the Cosmic Hunt are common in cultures of Northern Eurasia and the Americas, and include the story of Callisto in classical sources. The prey animal is either a bear or an ungulate, and the constellation it is transformed into is typically the four stars of the bowl in the Big Dipper asterism of Ursa Major. In some variants blood or grease may fall from the wounded animal; in an Iroquois version the blood causes leaves to change color in autumn. Sometimes the hunters are also placed in the firmament, represented by the stars of the Big Dipper's handle.

The original prototype of the myth must have been invented at least 15,000 years ago for it to have diffused across the Bering land bridge. It has been suggested to provide evidence for punctuated equilibrium as a system for myth evolution.

References

Further reading

  (2009, 2012). “Seven brothers and the cosmic hunt: European sky in the past”. In: Kronberg, Kõiva and Kuperjanov (eds.). Universumit Uudistades Paar Sammukest XXVI. Eesti Kirjandusmuuseumi Aastaraamat.artu: Eesti kirjandusmuuseum. pp. 31–69. DOI: 10.7592/PS/26-3berezkin

 Vieira, Vincent. “The Constellation of Orion and the Cosmic Hunt in Equatorial Africa”. In: Anthropos 104, no. 2 (2009): 558–61. http://www.jstor.org/stable/40467194.

Comparative mythology
Astronomical myths
Big Dipper